is a railway station on the Hitahikosan Line in Kokura Minami-ku, Kitakyūshū, Japan, operated by Kyushu Railway Company (JR Kyushu).

Lines
Ishiharamachi Station is served by the Hitahikosan Line.

Adjacent stations

Surrounding area
 Hiraodai Nature Observation Center

See also
 List of railway stations in Japan

External links

  

Railway stations in Fukuoka Prefecture
Buildings and structures in Kitakyushu
Railway stations in Japan opened in 1915